is a Japanese novel by Yusuke Kishi. It was originally published in January 2008 by Kodansha. It follows Saki that lives quietly in a beautiful and calm village, and has just acquired her power at the age of twelve. She then goes to the academy to learn how to master it with other young people in her age, including her friends Maria, Shun, Satoru and Mamoru. But during an outing, the five of them will learn things they never should have known.

The story received a manga adaptation in Kodansha's manga magazine Bessatsu Shōnen Magazine, which was serialized between May 2012 and June 2014, and an anime television series adaptation by A-1 Pictures, which aired in Japan between October 2012 and March 2013. In North America, the manga has been licensed by Vertical (itself an imprint of Kodansha USA) and the anime is licensed by Sentai Filmworks.

In 2008, From the New World won the Grand Prize of the 29th Nihon SF Taisho Award.

Synopsis

Setting
In AD 3013, 1,000 years after the modern era, 0.3 percent of the population developed psychic abilities called "Canto". Soon after these powers manifest themselves, many begin using Canto for violence and crime, and the conscious and unconscious use of these powers altered the wildlife and the environment. This led to a breakdown of modern society and a world war which devastated the human population and caused the fall of modern society. This was followed by oppressive and feudalistic regimes, but these too dissolved in chaos due to the violence of the psychic humans. Eventually, the psychic-endowed humans established a stable society by controlling their powers using genetic modification and social conditioning. They made themselves incapable of violence against other humans by implementing Attack Inhibition and creating Death Feedback which would be activated if a psychic human kills another, causing the murderer's organs to shut down and die almost instantly. The villages also used genetically designed animals for various purposes. The mole-like Queerats resemble humanity, are able to speak human language and live in a complex eusocial society ruled by queens.

Plot

Part I
Shin Sekai Yori follows the life of Saki Watanabe, a girl from the town of Kamisu 66. In this era, all humans possess powerful psychic abilities and live an idyllic life in agrarian villages. Despite her parents' fears that she may not awaken her powers, Saki gains her special powers at the age of twelve and joins her friends—Satoru Asahina, Maria Akizuki, Mamoru Itou, Shun Aonuma, and Reiko Amano—in Sage Academy, a special school for psychics. However, the children are unaware that the village government is monitoring and evaluating students through the education system. Based on these evaluations, certain students are removed from society because of reasons such as poor performance (such as with Reiko) or for cheating. The memories of the removed students are erased from the community; Saki and her remaining friends have no memory of Reiko and other students. During an unsupervised camping field trip, Saki and her friends capture a False Minoshiro, a mythical animal revealed to be an ancient library robot. The False Minoshiro explains the violent truth of how the current era came about and what their special powers truly are.

While interrogating the False Minoshiro, Saki and her friends are found by the monk Rijin. He destroys the False Minoshiro and seemingly seals away the children's special powers for associating with a demon. On the way back to be judged at the village, Rijin is killed by a rogue Queerat tribe while Saki and Satoru are separated from their friends. They are captured by the rogue Queerat colony. Using objects found during their trip, Saki and Satoru are able to escape their prison. During their escape, they meet a Queerat, Squealer, of the Robber Fly colony who rescues them from their pursuers. Saki and Satoru help Squealer and his colony to defeat the rogue Queerats, later with assistance from General Kiroumaru and his Giant Hornet colony, a colony with an especially close relationship to humans. After regrouping with their friends with the help of Squealer and general Kiroumaru, Saki restores their powers, using the same hypnotic methods the village uses to control children, before returning to the village under the belief that the adults do not know of their transgressions.

Part II
Two years later, as Saki and her friends reach adolescence and develop relationships, Shun starts to distance himself from the others and eventually goes missing. Saki finds Shun in an abandoned house and learns that he has become a Karmic Demon and had been sent to die in isolation. After holding himself back for the duration of their meeting, Shun tells Saki to go while telling her the adults know of their transgressions two years ago before using his powers to take his own life. Soon after, unlike with Reiko, Saki and her remaining friends start to realize Shun's absence despite being unable to fully remember him. In time, Saki learns that the survival of herself and her friends has been orchestrated by the Education board and the Ethics Committee Head Tomiko Asahina, who sees Saki as a potential successor. Later, Mamoru and Maria run away after the Education Board tries to purge Mamoru. Squealer, renamed by the humans as Yakomaru as a reward for his usefulness, helps them by staging their deaths. However, after finding the Robber Fly queen lobotomized and that Yakomaru acquired a False Minoshiro, Saki begins to have dreams of a faceless child that tells her not to find Mamoru and Maria as they must die.

Part III
Now 26 years old, Saki works for the village government in the "Department of Mutant Management" which oversees the Queerats. Yakomaru's colony slowly ascends to power while conquering other colonies and wiping out the Giant Hornet colony, eventually attacking Kamisu 66 with what is believed to be a Fiend that the Queerats refer to as their "Messiah." This is later revealed to be the biological child of Mamoru and Maria who Yakomaru raised after murdering the parents. After evading the Fiend and learning that Yakomaru intends to steal more human infants to create an army to wipe out the human race, Saki and Satoru are joined by Kiroumaru who guides them to the ruins of Tokyo to find the "Psychobuster"; an anthrax-like anti-psychic weapon. With Yakomaru's forces surrounding them, Satoru attempts to kill the Messiah with the Psychobuster, but Saki destroys the weapon because its use at such close proximity would also have killed Satoru. Saki realizes that the Messiah is not truly a Fiend, but actually a regular psychic like themselves, with one key difference: the Messiah considers Queerats as his kin which is what enables him to bypass the Death Feedback when attacking other humans. With seemingly no options left, Saki and Satoru plead with Kiroumaru for help. After admitting his own disdain towards humans and their treatment of his kind, Kiroumaru agrees to help, but asks for his colony to be spared the humans' retaliation once the revolt is ended. He disguises himself as a human and attacks the Messiah. The Messiah kills Kiroumaru, but upon realizing that Kiroumaru is a type of Queerat, dies due to Death Feedback.

With the Messiah dead and his rebellion crushed Squealer is defeated. Renouncing the name the humans gave him, Squealer is sentenced to perpetual torture of the "Infinite Hell" where his body is simultaneously regenerated and destroyed using psychic powers. However, Saki is troubled when Squealer explains the reasons behind his revolt, claiming that his people are human. Later, Saki learns from Satoru that the Queerats are the descendants of normal humans whose DNA had been altered with mole rat genes to make it easier for the psychic humans to control them, since they will not trigger Attack Inhibition and Death Feedback. Now feeling sorry for Squealer, Saki secretly puts him out of his misery.

In the epilogue ten years later, Saki has married Satoru and they expect their first child. Both are positive that the world will be a better place by the time their child grows up.

Characters

Main characters

Initially, Saki is 12 years old, has short brown hair and argues a lot with Satoru while having a crush on Shun. Two years later, her hair now shoulder-length, she becomes Maria's girlfriend. Despite that, her feelings for Shun remain strong. After several incidents occur, she is eager to know the true secrets of the town. Tomiko also reveals that she has a strong mental stability capable of overcoming setbacks. After the second timeskip, she is 26 and now works at the Department of Mutant Management, investigating and regulating the Queerat colonies. In the epilogue, she marries Satoru and succeeds Tomiko as head of the Ethics Committee. Pregnant, Saki writes her experiences down so future generations would read in hope the world becomes a better place.

Satoru is an energetic and mischievous boy who likes to argue with Saki. He is also observant, smart and skillful in using his telekinesis. After the timeskip, Satoru becomes Shun's boyfriend, but he starts dating another boy shortly after their breakup. After a second timeskip, he becomes Saki's partner and closest friend. He is adept at creating reflections, in the form of creating mirrors out of air - a skill that turns out to be incredibly useful. After the battle with the Queerats, Satoru also discovers the disturbing truth about the Queerats' origin and years later, becomes Saki's husband.

Shun is the smartest and most composed of the group of friends and is able to think his way out of any situation. He is also very knowledgeable. Shun is also implied to be the most talented telekineticist of their generation. After the timeskip, he becomes Satoru's boyfriend, but later breaks up with him. It is also revealed that Shun had loved Saki since childhood, but he chose to avoid her due to his growing uncontrollable power. Near the end, he seems to have manifested a part of himself in Saki's consciousness, giving her crucial advice in order to change her decisions in the last few episodes.

Maria has long red hair and is stated to be the most popular girl in her class. After the timeskip, she develops feelings for Saki and becomes her girlfriend, although she later forms a duty pair with Mamoru. She is particularly adept at matter movement (e.g. levitation). After Mamoru runs away, she leaves the others to join him. It is revealed that she was pregnant with Mamoru's child and was held by the Robber Fly colony before she was murdered upon her child's birth.

Mamoru is the most timid and the least talented of the group. Following the timeskip, he grows to have a crush on Maria and eventually partners with her as a duty pair. After learning about the Board of Education's plans to dispose of him, he leaves the village and hides in the mountains. Maria promises him that they will never be apart again, subsequently joining him and leaving the others behind. After the second time skip, with Tomiko confirming it, Mamoru was killed by the Robber Fly Queerats and had a child with Maria that Squealer raised to be the Queerats' "Messiah".

Humans

Satoru's grandmother and also the head of the Ethics Committee. She intends for Saki to succeed her position as she possesses a strong mental stability as well as the qualities of a leader. Because of this, she had asked the Board of Education not to dispose of Saki and her friends despite knowing about the true history. She also revealed that they were responsible for erasing their bad memories of the past to protect the minds of the townsfolk. With the ability to regenerate the telomeres in her cells, Tomiko has managed to extend her life, having lived for more than 250 years.

The adviser of the Security Council and also the village's strongest telekineticist. He wears a hooded mask and has double irises in each eye, capable of detecting and dispelling attacks from all directions. He also displays calmness and confidence in retaliation against the Queerats' attack on the village but is still powerless against the Fiend.

Chairman of the Board of Education. She is the most anxious and cautious among the council representatives. She dies in the Queerats attack during the Summer Festival.

Vice-chairman of the Board of Education.

The representative of the Occupations Council. He was killed by a sneak attack in the Queerats attack during the Summer Festival.

Saki's mother and also the head of the library. She entrusted Saki with the mission to search for the last weapon of mass destruction "Psychobuster" to eliminate the Fiend.

Saki's father.

A Wildlife Protection officer. He was tasked to annihilate the Robber Fly colony and its allies but his mission failed. He was saved by Kiroumaru and he later accompanied Saki's group to Tokyo for her mission.

An old, heavily bearded head priest of the Temple of Purification. He conducts the ritual for children entering adulthood.

A high priest of the Temple of Purification who seals away the children's telekinesis for breaking the rules and escorts them to be judged.

Reiko is the sixth member of Saki's group at the beginning of the story. Due to her weak performance in class, she was the first student to be killed by an Impure Cat.

Queerats
The  are humanoid molerat mutants who live in colonies and appear obedient to the humans to the point of referring to them as gods. However, during the attack on the humans by Squealer, it's revealed that the Queerats disdain humans for the way they're treated. Saki eventually learns to her horror that Queerats are actually the descendants of normal humans who were genetically modified with molerat DNA to enable the humans with special powers to subjugate those who don't suffer the Death of Shame, whom they would otherwise be defenseless against.

 

Starting off as a lowly member of the Robber Fly colony who once offered help to Saki and Satoru, Squealer eventually attains knowledge and gains political clout to become the supreme commander of the Robber Fly colony, earning the name 'Yakomaru' while exhibiting a machiavellian nature. Despite being a weak and small colony initially, the Robber Fly colony grew to rival the Giant Hornets colony after the second timeskip. He initially appears to be faithful to the humans, but secretly learned the truth of his kind's origin, after which he planned to wipe out the human population and liberate all Queerats. The opportunity came when he had the runaway Maria and Mamoru murdered to obtain their newborn child to raise as both one of his own and as the Queerats' "Messiah". Squealer's plan was thwarted by Saki and he was later sentenced to suffer the 'Infinite Hell', consumed by his own nervous system and in agonizing pain. However, upon learning the truth behind the Queerats, Saki secretly gives Squealer a merciful death.

The supreme commander of the Giant Hornet colony, he risked his own life to let Saki and Satoru return to their friends instead of executing them. Much later on, Kiroumaru's colony was decimated by the Robber Fly colony with the aid of their "Messiah" and he ended up at the Temple of Purification. After being released by Saki, Kiroumaru leads her and her group to the ruins of Tokyo to obtain the Psycho Buster to thwart Squealer's plans. After the plan with the Psycho Buster fails, revealing his own disdain for humans, Kiroumaru asks Saki to spare his colony from the humans' retaliation as he sacrifices himself to defeat the "Messiah".

A member of the Goat Moth colony. Saki saved him from drowning when he fell into a river. Two years later, he repaid the favor by saving Mamoru after he fell off a cliff. He gives Saki a letter from Maria.

Media

Novel
The novel From the New World was written by the Japanese author Yusuke Kishi and published by Kodansha. It is titled after Antonín Dvořák's Symphony No. 9 "From the New World", whose Movement II appears in the story several times. Its original publication was on January 23, 2008, in two volumes. On August 7, 2009, it was re-released as a single volume under the Kodansha Novels imprint; and again on January 14, 2011, as three volumes under the Kodansha Bunko imprint.

Manga
A manga adaption of the novel, drawn by Tōru Oikawa, was serialized in Kodansha's manga magazine Bessatsu Shōnen Magazine. The first chapter was published in the June 2012 issue on May 9, 2012, and the final in the July 2014 issue on June 9, 2014. The series has been collected in seven tankōbon volumes under the Kodansha Comics imprint, released between October 9, 2012, and August 8, 2014. In 2013 the series was licensed in English by Vertical Inc, who released it between November 12, 2013, and January 20, 2015.

Anime
The novel was adapted into an anime television series by A-1 Pictures which aired on TV Asahi from October 2012 to March 2013.

It has been licensed by Sentai Filmworks in North America. Sentai Filmworks later released the English dub version on DVD and Blu-Ray on April 15, 2014. Hanabee Entertainment later licensed the series on February 23, 2014 alongside Campione! and The Familiar of Zero.

Reception
Along with Den-noh Coil, From the New World  received the Grand Prize of the 29th Nihon SF Taisho Award by the Science Fiction and Fantasy Writers of Japan (SFWJ) in 2008.

Notes

References

External links
Anime official website 

2008 Japanese novels
2012 anime television series debuts
A-1 Pictures
Dark fantasy anime and manga
Dystopian anime and manga
Experimental medical treatments in fiction
Kodansha manga
Novels about genetic engineering
Novels about psychic powers
Post-apocalyptic anime and manga
Sentai Filmworks
Shōnen manga
TV Asahi original programming
Television shows based on Japanese novels
Thriller anime and manga
Vertical (publisher) titles